Drăgănești is a commune in Bihor County, Crișana, Romania. It is composed of ten villages: Belejeni (Belényeshegy), Drăgănești, Grădinari (Kisnyégerfalva), Livada Beiușului (Belényesliváda), Mizieș (Mézes), Păcălești (established 2008), Păntășești (Panatasa), Sebiș (Körössebes), Talpe (Talp), and Țigăneștii de Beiuș (Cigányosd).

The commune lies at the foot of the Apuseni Mountains, on the banks of the Crișul Pietros River. It is crossed by national road , which runs from the county seat, Oradea,  to the north of Drăgănești, to Deva,  to the south.

At the 2011 census, Drăgănești had a population of 2,967 people. Of those, 87% were Romanians, 7.4% Hungarians, and 2.5% Roma.

The poet  (1914–1989) was born and died in Livada Beiușului.

References

Communes in Bihor County
Localities in Crișana